NASA's Lunabotics Challenge

Since 2010, NASA’s Lunabotics competition has provided college students from around the country an opportunity to engage with the NASA Systems Engineering process to design and build a robotic Lunar excavator capable of mining regolith and icy regolith simulants.

Some of the deliverables include a Project Management Plan, a Public Outreach Report, Presentations and Demonstrations, and a Systems Engineering Paper. The rules and rubrics evolve each year to account for changes to the Artemis Program mission objectives and advances in commercially available technology. The competition allows NASA to gather and evaluate design and operational data for future robotic excavators and builders. The complexities the robots will have to master are the abrasive characteristics of the regolith simulant, the resources required to excavate and construct, the weight and size limitations of the Lunar robot and the ability to operate by remote control (tele-operate) or through autonomous operations. 

For more than a decade, NASA has been able to gather valuable data about necessary excavation hardware and surface locomotion processes that can be implemented as the agency prepares to return to the Moon through the Artemis program. We plan to put in place sustainable infrastructure that will allow us to explore and study more of the Moon than ever before and all in preparation for the human exploration of Mars. To support these goals, participating teams will use the systems engineering process to design and construct a prototype Lunar robot to demonstrate the technologies required for a sustainable human presence on the Moon, and to build those items using “Infrastructure to Stay” technologies. 

This is a two-semester, virtual challenge, designed to educate college students in the application of the NASA Systems Engineering process that may culminate with the design and build of a prototype Lunar robot. The events are as follows:

The Challenges

1.  Project Management Plan

2. Systems Engineering Paper

3.  Public Outreach Report

4.  Presentation and Demonstration (optional)

5.  Proof of Life Video

For more information see the Lunabotics Guidebook at https://www.nasa.gov/offices/education/centers/kennedy/technology/nasarmc.html

Why the Moon

The Moon was the first place beyond Earth humans tried to reach as the Space Age began in the late 1950s. More than 100 robotic explorers from more than half a dozen nations have since sent spacecraft to the Moon. Nine crewed missions have flown to the Moon and back. The former Soviet Union logged the first successes with its Luna program, starting with Luna 1 in 1959. NASA followed with a series of robotic Ranger and Surveyor spacecraft that performed increasingly complex tasks that made it possible for the first human beings to walk on the Moon in 1969. Twenty-four humans have traveled from the Earth to the Moon. Twelve walked on its surface. The last human visited the Lunar surface in 1972.

NASA directly benefits from this challenge by annually assessing student designs and data the same way it does for its own, less frequent, prototypes. Encouraging innovation in student designs increases the potential of identifying clever solutions to the many challenges inherent in future Artemis missions. Advances for off-world mining and construction offer new possibilities for the same activities here on Earth, expanding the benefits beyond NASA alone. These industries will create a workforce posed to lead a new space-based economy and add to the economic strength of our country.

“Lunabotics is Good for NASA, Good for America, Good for All of Us”

References
NASA Lunabotics Website

https://www.nasa.gov/offices/education/centers/kennedy/technology/nasarmc.html

Novel Approaches to Drilling and Excavation on the Moon

https://arc.aiaa.org/doi/pdf/10.2514/6.2009-6431

Preparing for Mars: Evolvable Mars Campaign “Proving Ground” approach

https://ieeexplore.ieee.org/abstract/document/7119274

NASA Human Spaceflight Architecture Team: Lunar Surface Exploration Strategies

https://ntrs.nasa.gov/citations/20120008182

NASA Centennial Challenge: 3D-Printed Habitat

https://ntrs.nasa.gov/api/citations/20170009010/downloads/20170009010.pdf

Lunar Spaceport: Construction of Lunar Landing & Launch Pads

https://commons.erau.edu/cgi/viewcontent.cgi?article=1017&context=spaceport-summit

TOWARDS IN-SITU MANUFACTURE OF MAGNETIC DEVICES FROM RARE EARTH MATERIALS MINED FROM ASTEROIDS

https://robotics.estec.esa.int/i-SAIRAS/isairas2018/Papers/Session%2010c/1_iSAIRAS_Ellery_2018_final-11-40-Ellery-Alex.pdf

NASA Centennial Challenge: 3D Printed Habitat, Phase 3 Final Results

https://ntrs.nasa.gov/citations/20190032473

A Process Plant for Producing Rocket Fuel From Lunar Ice

https://asmedigitalcollection.asme.org/IMECE/proceedings-abstract/IMECE2019/V006T06A108/1073266

Robotic Construction on the Moonhttps://ntrs.nasa.gov/api/citations/20210018912/downloads/Design%20for%20Robotic%20Construction%20on%20the%20Moon%20ISU%20SSP%2021%20STRIVES.pdf

ISRU: The Basalt Economy.

https://www.researchgate.net/profile/Rodrigo-Romo-2/publication/322567782_ISRU_The_Basalt_Economy/links/5a5fff9c458515b4377b89cb/ISRU-The-Basalt-Economy.pdf

RASSOR - Regolith Advanced Surface Systems Operations Robot

https://ntrs.nasa.gov/citations/20150022134

Building a Vertical Take Off and Landing Pad Using in situ Materials

http://ssi.org/2010/SM14-proceedings/Building-a-Vertical-Take-Off-and-Landing-Pad-using-in-situ-Materials-Hintze.pdf

Mars Water In-Situ Resource Utilization (ISRU) Planning (M-WIP) Study

https://mepag.jpl.nasa.gov/reports/Mars_Water_ISRU_Study.pdf

Affordable, Rapid Bootstrapping of the Space Industry and Solar System Civilization

https://arxiv.org/abs/1612.03238

Additive Construction with Mobile Emplacement (ACME)

https://www.researchgate.net/profile/Rodrigo-Romo-2/publication/322567924_Additive_Construction_with_Mobile_Emplacement_ACME/links/5a5ffe7faca2727352458863/Additive-Construction-with-Mobile-Emplacement-ACME.pdf

A Review of Extra-Terrestrial Mining Concepts

https://ntrs.nasa.gov/citations/20120008777

NASA
Engineering competitions
Engineering education
Student competitions